Events in the year 2008 in Hong Kong.

Incumbents
 Chief Executive: Donald Tsang

Events

 September 7: 2008 Hong Kong legislative election

See also
 List of Hong Kong films of 2008

References 

 
Years of the 21st century in Hong Kong
Hong Kong
Hong Kong